Parikshit Tamaliya (born 23 June 1996) is an Indian theater and film actor from Gujarat, India. He is one of the rising Gujarati film actors. He is known for his role in Gujarati films Duniyadari (2017 film) (2017). He later starred in films like Saheb (film) (2019), Prem Prakran (2022) and Saatam Aatham (2022).

Career
Parikshit debuted in Gujarati cinema in 2017 with Duniyadari (2017 film) directed by Shital Shah. Later he acted in Saheb (film) (2019), Prem Prakran (2022).

In 2022, He appeared as lead actor in Saatam Aatham directed by Shital Shah which received a lot of attention from netizens.

Filmography

References

External links

 

Living people
Male actors in Gujarati-language films
Gujarati theatre
Gujarati people
Male actors from Ahmedabad
Indian male stage actors
Indian male film actors
21st-century Indian male actors
1996 births